The  are handled by the Ministry of Foreign Affairs of Japan.

Japan maintains diplomatic relations with every United Nations member state except for North Korea, in addition to UN observer states Holy See, as well as Kosovo, Cook Islands and Niue.

Japanese foreign relations had earliest beginnings in 14th century and after their opening to the world in 1854 with the Convention of Kanagawa. Japan rapidly modernized and built a strong military. It was imperialistic seeking control of nearby areas—with major wars against China and Russia. It gained control of parts of China and Manchuria, as well as Korea and islands such as Taiwan and Okinawa. It lost in World War II and was stripped of all of its foreign conquests and possessions.  See History of Japanese foreign relations.  American general Douglas MacArthur,  acting for the Allied powers, supervised occupied Japan 1945–51. Since occupation ended diplomatic policy has been based on close partnership with the United States and seeking trade agreements,  In the Cold War, Japan was demilitarized but it allied with the U.S. in the confrontation with the Soviet Union. It played a major support role in the Korean War (1950-1953). In the rapid economic developments in the 1960s and 1970s, Japan was one of the major economic powers in the world.

By the 1990s  Japan participated in the Peacekeeping operations by the UN, and sent troops to Cambodia, Mozambique, Golan Heights and the East Timor. After the 9/11 terror attacks in 2001, Japanese naval vessels have been assigned to resupply duties in the Indian Ocean to the present date. The Ground Self-Defense Force also dispatched their troops to Southern Iraq for the restoration of basic infrastructures.

Foreign policy

Beyond its immediate neighbors, Japan has pursued a more active foreign policy in recent years, recognizing the responsibility which accompanies its economic strength. Japanese Prime Minister Yasuo Fukuda stressed a changing direction in a policy speech to the National Diet: "Japan aspires to become a hub of human resource development as well as for research and intellectual contribution to further promote cooperation in the field of peace-building." This follows the modest success of a Japanese-conceived peace plan which became the foundation for nationwide elections in Cambodia in 1998.

History

Links
 Foreign relations of Meiji Japan
 International relations of the Great Powers (1814–1919)
 Diplomatic history of World War I
 International relations (1919–1939)
 Causes of World War II
 Diplomatic history of World War II
 Cold War
 History of Sino-Japanese relations, China
 France–Japan relations
 Germany–Japan relations
 Greater East Asia Co-Prosperity Sphere, 1930–1945
 History of Japan–Korea relations 
 Japan–North Korea relations
 Japan–South Korea relations
 Japanese foreign policy on Southeast Asia
 Japan–Russia relations
 Japan–Soviet Union relations
 Japan–United Kingdom relations
 Japan–United States relations

Africa
Japan is increasingly active in Africa. In May 2008, the first Hideyo Noguchi Africa Prize will be awarded at Fourth Tokyo International Conference on African Development (TICAD IV), which signals a changing emphasis in bilateral relations.

Americas

Japan has continued to extend significant support to development and technical assistance projects in Latin America.

Asia

Southeast Asia

By 1990 Japan's interaction with the vast majority of Asia-Pacific countries, especially its burgeoning economic exchanges, was multifaceted and increasingly important to the recipient countries. The developing countries of the Association of Southeast Asian Nations (ASEAN) regarded Japan as critical to their development. Japan's aid to the ASEAN countries totaled US$1.9 billion in Japanese fiscal year (FY) 1988 versus about US$333 million for the United States during U.S. FY 1988. As of the late 1980s, Japan was the number one foreign investor in the ASEAN countries, with cumulative investment as of March 1989 of about US$14.5 billion, more than twice that of the United States. Japan's share of total foreign investment in ASEAN countries in the same period ranged from 70 to 80 percent in Thailand to 20 percent in Indonesia.

In the late 1980s, the Japanese government was making a concerted effort to enhance its diplomatic stature, especially in Asia. Toshiki Kaifu's much publicized spring 1991 tour of five Southeast Asian nations—Malaysia, Brunei, Thailand, Singapore, and the Philippines—culminated in a 3 May major foreign policy address in Singapore, in which he called for a new partnership with the ASEAN and pledged that Japan would go beyond the purely economic sphere to seek an "appropriate role in the political sphere as a nation of peace." As evidence of this new role, Japan took an active part in promoting negotiations to resolve the Cambodian conflict.

In 1997, the ASEAN member nations and the People's Republic of China, South Korea and Japan agreed to hold yearly talks to further strengthen regional cooperation, the ASEAN Plus Three meetings. In 2005 the ASEAN plus Three countries together with India, Australia and New Zealand held the inaugural East Asia Summit (EAS).

South Asia
In South Asia, Japan's role is mainly that of an aid donor. Japan's aid to seven South Asian countries totaled US$1.1 billion in 1988. Except for Pakistan, which received heavy inputs of aid from the United States, all other South Asian countries received most of their aid from Japan as of the early 1990s. Four South Asian nations—India, Pakistan, Bangladesh, and Sri Lanka—are in the top ten list of Tokyo's aid recipients worldwide as of the early 1990s. A point to note is that Indian Government has receive no aid since the 2004 Tsunami that struck India but Indian registered NGOs look to Japan for much investment in their projects.

Prime Minister Toshiki Kaifu signaled a broadening of Japan's interest in South Asia with his swing through the region in April 1990. In an address to the Indian parliament, Kaifu stressed the role of free markets and democracy in bringing about "a new international order," and he emphasized the need for a settlement of the Kashmir territorial dispute between India and Pakistan and for economic liberalization to attract foreign investment and promote dynamic growth. To India, which was very short of hard currency, Kaifu pledged a new concessional loan of ¥100 billion (about US$650 million) for the coming year.

Europe

In what became known as the Tenshō embassy, the first ambassadors from Japan to European powers reached Lisbon, Portugal in August 1584. From Lisbon, the ambassadors left for the Vatican in Rome, which was the main goal of their journey. The embassy returned to Japan in 1590, after which time the four nobleman ambassadors were ordained by Alessandro Valignano as the first Japanese Jesuit fathers.

A second embassy, headed by Hasekura Tsunenaga and sponsored by Date Masamune, was also a diplomatic mission to the Vatican. The embassy left 28 October 1613 from Ishinomaki, Miyagi Prefecture, in the northern Tōhoku region of Japan, where Date was daimyō. It traveled to Europe by way of New Spain, arriving in Acapulco on 25 January 1614, Mexico City in March, Havana in July, and finally Seville on 23 October 1614. After a short stop-over in France, the embassy reached Rome in November 1615, where it was received by Pope Paul V. After return travel by way of New Spain and the Philippines, the embassy reached the harbor of Nagasaki in August 1620. While the embassy was gone, Japan had undergone significant change, starting with the 1614 Osaka Rebellion, leading to a 1616 decree from the Tokugawa shogunate that all interaction with non-Chinese foreigners was confined to Hirado and Nagasaki. In fact, the only western country that was allowed to trade with Japan was the Dutch Republic. This was the beginning of "sakoku", where Japan was essentially closed to the western world until 1854.

Modern era

The cultural and non-economic ties with Western Europe grew significantly during the 1980s, although the economic nexus remained by far the most important element of Japanese – West European relations throughout the decade. Events in West European relations, as well as political, economic, or even military matters, were topics of concern to most Japanese commentators because of the immediate implications for Japan. The major issues centred on the effect of the coming West European economic unification on Japan's trade, investment, and other opportunities in Western Europe. Some West European leaders were anxious to restrict Japanese access to the newly integrated European Union, but others appeared open to Japanese trade and investment. In partial response to the strengthening economic ties among nations in Western Europe and to the United States–Canada–Mexico North American Free Trade Agreement, Japan and other countries along the Asia-Pacific rim began moving in the late 1980s toward greater economic cooperation.

On 18 July 1991, after several months of difficult negotiations, Prime Minister Toshiki Kaifu signed a joint statement with the Dutch prime minister and head of the European Community Council, Ruud Lubbers, and with the European Commission president, Jacques Delors, pledging closer Japanese – European Community consultations on foreign relations, scientific and technological cooperation, assistance to developing countries, and efforts to reduce trade conflicts. Japanese Ministry of Foreign Affairs officials hoped that this agreement would help to broaden Japanese – European Community political links and raise them above the narrow confines of trade disputes.

Oceania

Disputed territories

Japan has several territorial disputes with its neighbors concerning the control of certain outlying islands.

Japan contests Russia's control of the Southern Kuril Islands (including Etorofu, Kunashiri, Shikotan, and the Habomai group) which were occupied by the Soviet Union in 1945. South Korea's assertions concerning Liancourt Rocks (Japanese: "Takeshima", Korean: "Dokdo") are acknowledged, but not accepted by Japan. Japan has strained relations with the People's Republic of China (PRC) and the Republic of China (Taiwan) over the Senkaku Islands; and with the People's Republic of China over the status of Okinotorishima.

These disputes are in part about irredentism; and they are also about the control of marine and natural resources, such as possible reserves of crude oil and natural gas.

See also

 Foreign policy of Japan
 List of diplomatic missions in Japan
 List of diplomatic missions of Japan
 List of Japanese overseas military actions
 List of war apology statements issued by Japan
 Hotta Masayoshi
 Visa requirements for Japanese citizens

References

Further reading
  Akagi, Roy Hidemichi. Japan's Foreign Relations 1542-1936: A Short History (Hokuseido Press, 1936). online 560pp
 Akimoto, Daisuke. The Abe Doctrine: Japan's Proactive Pacifism and Security Strategy (Springer, 2018).
 Barnhart, Michael A. Japan and the World since 1868 (Hodder Education, 1995) excerpt
 Bradford, John. "Southeast Asia: A New Strategic Nexus for Japan's Maritime Strategy." CIMSEC (September 2020). online
 Buckley, Roger. US-Japan Alliance Diplomacy 1945–1990 (Cambridge University Press, 1992).
 Duus, Peter, ed. The Cambridge History of Japan, Vol. 6: The Twentieth Century (Cambridge University Press, 1989).
 Gustafsson, Karl, Linus Hagström, and Ulv Hanssen. "Japan's pacifism is dead." Survival 60.6 (2018): 137-158.
 Hatano, Sumio. One Hundred Fifty Years of Japanese Foreign Relations: From 1868 to 2018 (Japan Publishing Industry Foundation for Culture, 2022). 
 Hook, Glenn D. et al. Japan's International Relations: Politics, Economics and Security 3rd ed (Routledge, 2011), covers 1945–2010.
 Inoguchi, Takashi. Japan's Foreign Policy in an Era of Global Change (Bloomsbury, 2013).
 Iriye, Akira. Japan and the Wider World: From the Mid-Nineteenth Century to the Present (Routledge, 1997).
Iriye, Akira and Robert A. Wampler eds. Partnership: The United States and Japan, 1951-2001 (Kodansha International, 2001). online
 Kibata, Yoichi and Ian Nish, eds. The History of Anglo-Japanese Relations, 1600–2000: Volume I: The Political-Diplomatic Dimension, 1600–1930 (Palgrave Macmillan, 2000)  excerpt, first of five topical volumes also covering social, economic and military relations between Japan and Great Britain.
 LaFeber, Walter. The Clash: A History of U.S.-Japan Relations (W. W. Norton, 1997), a standard scholarly history; online
 Malafaia, Thiago Corrêa. "Japanese International Relations: An Assessment of the 1971–2011 Period." Brazilian Political Science Review 10.1 (2016).  online in English
 Maslow, Sebastian, Ra Mason, and Paul O’Shea, eds. Risk State: Japan's Foreign Policy in an Age of Uncertainty (Ashgate, 2015) 202pp excerpt 
 Matray, James I. ed. East Asia and the United States: An Encyclopedia of Relations since 1784 2 volumes (Greenwood, 2002).
 Peng Er, Lam, ed. Japan's Foreign Policy in the Twenty-First Century: Continuity and Change (Rowman & Littlefield, 2020). excerpt  
 Pugliese, Giulio, and Alessio Patalano. "Diplomatic and Security Practice under Abe Shinzō: The Case for Realpolitik Japan." Australian Journal of International Affairs 74.6 (2020): 615-632.
 Shimamoto, Mayako, Koji Ito, and Yoneyuki Sugita, eds. Historical Dictionary of Japanese Foreign Policy (Rowman & Littlefield, 2015) excerpt
 Togo, Kazuhiko. Japan's Foreign Policy 1945–2003 (Brill, 2005).
 Yoshimatsu, Hidetaka. "Japan's Role Conception in Multilateral Initiatives: The Evolution from Hatoyama to Abe." Australian Journal of International Affairs 72.2 (2018): 129-144.
 Zakowski, Karol et al. eds. Japan's Foreign Policy Making: Central Government Reforms, Decision-Making Processes, and Diplomacy (Springer, 2018). online
 Zakowski, Karol. "Nationalism vs. Interests: A Neoclassical Realist Perspective on Japan's Policy towards China under the Second Abe Administration." Pacific Focus 34.3 (2019): 473-495.

External links
 
 Various articles and discussion papers on Japan's foreign relations in the electronic journal of contemporary Japanese studies
 Rwanda: Kagame Addresses Japanese Senate
 Videos on Japan's Relations with the US from the Dean Peter Krogh Foreign Affairs Digital Archives